This is a list of future area codes in the North American Numbering Plan (NANP) in the planning stages for relief of central office code exhaustion in the given numbering plan areas (NPAs). The dates are subject to change during implementation as published in the official NANP Administrator Planning letters.

List 

†Indicates planned overlay.

*Indicates exhaust date of the existing area code(s) that require relief.

Area code 480's boundary with area codes 602 and 623 will be eliminated on September 12, 2023, to provide relief to area codes 480 and 602.

These area codes with exhaust dates by the fourth quarter of 2026 do not have an approved relief plan and relief area code: 213/323, 218, 318, 334, 423, 440, 507, 530, 559, 605, 620, 662, 713/281/832/346, 714/657, 765, 949, 956, 970, 989.

See also 

 List of North American Numbering Plan area codes

References

External links 

 NANPA Area Code Relief Planning

future
Area codes in the Caribbean
Area codes in the United States
Proposed infrastructure in Canada
Proposed infrastructure in the United States
Proposed telecommunications infrastructure
Canada communications-related lists
United States communications-related lists